Narcissus broussonetii is a species of the genus Narcissus (daffodils) in the family Amaryllidaceae. It is classified in Section Aurelia. It is native to North Africa.

References 

broussonetii
Garden plants